Koury Corporation is a real estate development company based in Greensboro, North Carolina. The company was founded by Joseph S. Koury in 1952.

The company is very diversified and owns apartment complexes, hotels, condos, shopping centers, golf courses, industrial parks, and residential communities. It built Greenboro's first shopping mall, the Four Seasons Town Centre, in 1974 and has pioneered much of the Piedmont Triad's early residential and commercial development.

The Sheraton Hotel Greensboro/Koury Convention Center is the largest hotel/convention center complex between Atlanta and Washington, DC and the Grandover Resort is considered to be North Carolina's premier golf resort. Koury Corporation has a number of departments, including construction, real estate, business development, housekeeping, communications, and at one time its own police department. The company employs more than 1400 people in the Greensboro area.

History
 In 1952, the company was founded by Joseph S. Koury.

 In 1974, it built Greenboro's first shopping mall, the Four Seasons Town Centre. The mall was sold to GGP Inc. in 2004.

 In February 2015, the company completed renovations to the Holiday Inn Greensboro Coliseum Hotel.

 In January 2016, Edmund W. Koury, the chairman of the company, died.

 In March 2017, the company renovated its Grandover Resort.

 In June 2017, the company began development of the 111-acre western portion of its Grandover development.

See also 

 Tamares Group
 CIM Group
 LaTerra Development
 Thor Equities

References

Real estate companies of the United States
Companies based in Greensboro, North Carolina
Real estate companies established in 1952
1952 establishments in North Carolina
American companies established in 1952